Leiopus is a genus of longhorn beetles of the subfamily Lamiinae.

Species
 Leiopus femoratus Fairmaire, 1859
 Leiopus kharazii Holzschuh, 1974
 Leiopus linnei Wallin, 2009 
 Leiopus nebulosus
 Leiopus punctulatus (Paykull, 1800)
 Leiopus syriacus Ganglbauer, 1884

References

Acanthocinini